Jairo Luís Zulbarán, known as Calanche (7 January 1970 – 15 March 2002), was a Colombian football forward.

Club career
Born in Santa Marta, Zulbarán began his professional football career with Unión Magdalena and would play for Sporting de Barranquilla, Independiente Medellín, Millonarios and Unicosta. He is one of Unicosta's all-time leading goal-scorers. He ended his career early after having problems with his knee ligaments.

International career
Zulbarán competed for Colombia at the 1989 FIFA World Youth Championship in Saudi Arabia and the 1992 Summer Olympics in Barcelona.

Personal life and death
In March 2002, Zulbarán was shot dead in a public market in downtown Santa Marta.

References

External links

1970 births
2002 deaths
People from Santa Marta
Colombian footballers
Colombia under-20 international footballers
Olympic footballers of Colombia
Footballers at the 1992 Summer Olympics
Unión Magdalena footballers
Independiente Medellín footballers
Millonarios F.C. players
Association football forwards
People murdered in Colombia
Colombian murder victims
Deaths by firearm in Colombia
Male murder victims
Sportspeople from Magdalena Department